Brenham Christian Academy was a private Christian school located in Brenham, Texas and was established in 1993 with its first graduating class of 1997. After a steady decline in the 2000s, the school closed and reopened as Citadel Christian School in 2018.

References 

History. Brenham Christian Academy. Retrieved on 2008-03-16.

Buildings and structures in Brenham, Texas
Christian schools in Texas
Educational institutions established in 1993
Nondenominational Christian schools in the United States
Private K-12 schools in Texas
Schools in Washington County, Texas
1993 establishments in Texas